Tadepalligudem mandal is one of the 19 mandals in West Godavari district of the Indian state of Andhra Pradesh. It is under the administration of Bhimavaram revenue division and the headquarters are located at Tadepalligudem. The mandal is bounded by Nallajerla, Devarapalle, Nidadavolu, Unguturu, Pentapadu, Tanuku and Undrajavaram mandals.

Demographics 

 census, the mandal had a population of 88,256 with 24,628 households. The total population constitute, 44,550 males and 43,706 females —a sex ratio of 981 females per 1000 males. 9,086 children are in the age group of 0–6 years, of which 4,563 are boys and 4,523 are girls. There are 54,483 literates.

Government and politics 
Tadepalligudem mandal is one of the 2 mandals under Tadepalligudem (Assembly constituency), which in turn represents Narsapuram (Lok Sabha constituency) of Andhra Pradesh.

Towns and villages 

 census of India, the mandal has 19 settlements, which includes 1 towns and 18 villages. Tadepalligudem (M) is the only town and Kunchanapalle (OG) is partly out growth to Tadepalligudem (M).

The settlements in the mandal are listed below:

Notes
(M) denotes a Municipality
(OG) denotes an Out Growth

See also 
 List of mandals in Andhra Pradesh

References

Mandals in West Godavari district